Hickory Creek is a tributary of the White River (Arkansas) in Madison County, Arkansas in the United States. Its GNIS I.D. number is 71948.

References

Rivers of Arkansas
Geography of Madison County, Arkansas